Maillard may refer to:

 Maillard (surname)
 Maillard (automobile)
 Maillard, a French bicycle parts brand purchased by Fichtel & Sachs in the 1980s

See also
 Maillard reaction
 Mallard (disambiguation)